The 2002 FIA European Touring Car Championship was the 29th season of European touring car racing and the second season of the European Touring Car Championship.

The season began at Magny-Cours on 20 April, and finished at Estoril on 20 October after twenty races over ten meetings.

Teams and drivers

Results and standings

Races

Standings

Drivers' Championship

† — Drivers did not finish the race, but were classified as they completed over 90% of the race distance.

References

External links

European Touring Car Championship seasons
European Touring Car Championship
2002 in European sport